Canadian content (abbreviated CanCon, cancon or can-con) refers to the Canadian Radio-television and Telecommunications Commission (CRTC) requirements, derived from the Broadcasting Act of Canada, that radio and television broadcasters (including cable and satellite specialty channels) must produce and/or broadcast a certain percentage of content that was at least partly written, produced, presented, or otherwise contributed to by persons from Canada. CanCon also refers to that content itself, and, more generally, to cultural and creative content that is Canadian in nature.

Current Canadian content percentages are as follows: radio airplay is 40% (with partial exceptions for some specialty formats such as classical), and broadcast television is 55% yearly or 50% daily (CBC has a 60% CanCon quota; some specialty or multicultural formats have lower percentages).

The loss of the protective Canadian content quota requirements is one of the concerns of those opposed to the Trans-Pacific Partnership. Canada entered into the Trans-Pacific Partnership, a multilateral free trade agreement, in October 2012.

Origins
In enforcing the  Broadcasting Act, the CRTC is obligated to ensure that "each element of the Canadian broadcasting system shall contribute in an appropriate manner to the creation and presentation of Canadian programming", and that every broadcast undertaking "[makes] maximum use, and in no case less than predominant use, of Canadian creative and other resources in the creation and presentation of programming".

Radio
For music, the requirements are referred to as the "MAPL system". Following an extensive public hearing process organized by the CRTC, the MAPL system, created by Stan Klees (co-creator of the Juno Award), was adopted in 1971 to define and identify Canadian content in pieces of music for the purposes of increasing exposure of Canadian music on Canadian radio through content regulations governing a percentage (25%) of airplay to be devoted to Canadian music. The percentage was increased to 30% in the 1980s, and to 35% effective January 3, 1999. However, most new commercial radio stations licensed since 1999 have been licensed at 40%.

Before the MAPL system was established in 1971, Canadian music was regarded with indifference by Canadian radio, and during the 1960s, Canadian radio was dominated by British or American acts. This was a major hurdle for Canadian musicians, since they could not gain attention in their home country without having a hit single in the United States or Europe first. Even after MAPL was implemented in the early 1970s, some radio stations were criticized for ghettoizing their Canadian content to dedicated program blocks, in off-peak listening hours such as early mornings or after midnight, during which the music played would be almost entirely Canadian — thus having the effect of significantly reducing how many Canadian songs would actually have to be played during peak listening times. These program blocks became mockingly known as "beaver hours," featuring Canadian songs selected from the "beaver bin." This practice is now reduced by CRTC regulations stipulating that CanCon percentages must be met between 6 a.m. and 6 p.m., rather than allowing a station to save all their Canadian content for off-peak hours.

Artists who were active in the early CanCon era in the 1970s and 1980s have noted that their music was often dismissed by Canadian audiences as inferior product, propped up by quotas rather than quality, if they were unable to replicate their Canadian success internationally. Yet, at the same time, artists who did break through internationally also ran the risk of becoming dismissed by Canadian audiences as no longer truly Canadian.

Some stations – especially those playing formats where there may be a limited number of Canadian recordings suitable for airplay, such as classical, jazz or oldies, may be allowed by the CRTC to meet Canadian content targets as low as 20 per cent. Stations in Windsor, Ontario, are also permitted to meet lower Canadian content targets, due to Windsor's proximity to the Metro Detroit media market in the United States. Community radio and campus-based community radio stations often choose to meet higher Canadian content levels than commercial broadcasters, because of their mandate to support independent and underground and provide content not readily available on commercial radio or the CBC; however, this is a voluntary commitment made by these stations rather than a core CRTC requirement, and CanCon requirements may be lower for campus and community stations as they often air large quantities of category 3 music.

On satellite radio services, Canadian content regulation is applied in aggregate over the whole subscription package. Sirius XM Canada produces channels focused on Canadian music, talk, and spoken word programming (such as Canada Talks, The Verge, and Just for Laughs Radio), and carries the CBC's main national networks (CBC Radio One and Ici Radio-Canada Première). All of these channels are incorporated into the overall lineup of the U.S. Sirius XM Radio service. The CBC also produced channels carried on the service, such as CBC Radio 3, but these channels were quietly dropped from Sirius XM in 2022 in favour of making them exclusive to the CBC's internet radio platform CBC Music.

Criteria
To qualify as Canadian content a musical selection must generally fulfil at least two of the following conditions (one if recorded prior to January 1972):

M (music) — the music is composed entirely by a Canadian
A (artist) — the music is, or the lyrics are, performed principally by a Canadian
P (performance) — the musical selection consists of a performance that is:
Recorded wholly in Canada, or
Performed wholly in Canada and broadcast live in Canada.
L (lyrics) — the lyrics are written entirely by a Canadian
For the purposes of MAPL, a "Canadian" refers to a citizen, permanent resident, someone whose "ordinary place of residence" has been in Canada prior to their contribution to the musical selection, or someone who is a CRTC licensee.

A musical selection may also qualify as Canadian content if it:

 Is an instrumental performance of a composition by a Canadian.
 Is a "performance of a musical composition that a Canadian has composed for instruments only."
 Was performed live or recorded after September 1, 1991, meets the criteria for either artist or performance, and a Canadian receives at least half of the credit for music and lyrics.

This last criterion was added in 1991, to accommodate Bryan Adams' album Waking Up the Neighbours. As Adams co-wrote both the music and the lyrics with South African producer Robert John "Mutt" Lange, and he did not primarily record the album in Canada, he only fulfilled one of the criteria. It was noted that if Adams had written all the lyrics, and Lange all the music (or vice versa), the collaboration would have counted as Canadian content. As a result, under CRTC regulations of the time, none of the album's songs were considered Canadian content. 

In December 2022, the CRTC announced a proposal to update the MAPL system to account for changes in the music industry and reduce regulatory burden. The proposal would remove the "performance" condition entirely, and only require lyrics and music to be principally (at least 50%) written or composed by a Canadian to qualify as Canadian content.

Talk radio and American syndicated programming

Unlike music radio, the rules on talk radio are more ambiguous. The vast majority of Canadian talk radio stations operate with local talk for most of the daylight hours, with the exception of two nationally syndicated Canadian talk show hosts: news/talk personality Charles Adler and sports talk host Bob McCown. The lone restriction is that the station must have a working studio within the region it broadcasts, which prohibits the use of entirely satellite-operated stations (which are commonplace in the United States).

Syndicated programming from the United States invariably airs after 7:00 pm local time in virtually all markets, and usually features non-political programs such as The Jim Rome Show and Coast to Coast AM. More political American shows such as The Rush Limbaugh Show are rarely picked up by Canadian radio stations, although the now defunct CFBN aired Dennis Miller and the Glenn Beck Program on tape delay in the evenings for a few months, from April through November 2007, when CFBN stopped broadcasting over the air, and The Phil Hendrie Show aired for many years on CKTB, even during the period when it focused on political content. Miller also aired on CHAM for two years from 2008 to 2010. No rule prevents programs such as Limbaugh or Beck from being aired on Canadian radio stations; such programs are simply not carried because their focus on American politics limits their relevance to Canadian radio audiences, especially given the high rights fees Limbaugh charged his affiliates.

As in the United States in the 1980s, the trend for AM stations in Canada in the 1990s was to apply for an FM broadcasting license or move away from music in favour of talk radio formats. (Since the late 2000s, AM radio in North America has been declining as stations have shut down and moved to FM.)  The total amount of Canadian-produced content declined as broadcasters could license syndicated radio programs produced in the U.S., while the Cancon regulations were conceived to apply to music only, and not to spoken-word programming. This became particularly controversial in 1998 when stations in Toronto and Montreal started airing The Howard Stern Show from New York City during prime daytime hours. Stern was forced off the air not because of Canadian content, but because the Canadian Broadcast Standards Council reprimanded the stations broadcasting Stern numerous times for Stern's comments, which prompted the two stations to drop him in short order. Stern would later move exclusively to satellite radio.

American shows that combine talk and music, such as Blair Garner, Elvis Duran, Delilah and John Tesh, usually have special playlists for airing in Canada to assist in meeting Canadian content requirements. Because of the different requirements, American syndicated oldies programs are widely popular in Canada, such as American Gold, Wolfman Jack, and M. G. Kelly's American Hit List. These shows usually do not substitute Canadian songs, due in part to a fairly large library of Canadian musicians already in rotation in the format (such as The Guess Who, Gordon Lightfoot, Paul Anka, Terry Jacks or R. Dean Taylor). In other formats, an American syndicated program sometimes is supplemented with an all-Canadian program; for instance, CKMX will broadcast Country Countdown USA and America's Grand Ole Opry Weekend along with the Canadian syndicated programs Canadian Country Spotlight and Hugh McLennan's Spirit of the West, the last of which is also carried by several U.S. stations. American syndicated series are usually played in "off peak" and weekend hours.

A notable exception to the majority-Canadian spoken word programming came in 2012 when Astral Media introduced CKSL and CHAM, two stations in southern Ontario, as full-time affiliates of 24/7 Comedy Radio, a service of the U.S.-based Cumulus Media Networks. CHAM meets its studio requirement by maintaining a locally based interstitial host.

Film and television

To an even greater extent than on radio, Canadian television programming has been a perennially difficult proposition for the broadcast industry, particularly dramatic programming in prime-time. It is much more economical for Canadian stations to buy the Canadian rights to an American prime-time series than to finance a new homemade production. Perhaps more importantly, given the reach of the major U.S. broadcast networks in Canada, it is virtually impossible to delay or modify a U.S. program's broadcast schedule, as regularly occurs in other foreign markets, to weed out failures or to otherwise accommodate homegrown programming.

In English Canada, presently only the public network, CBC Television, devotes the vast majority of its prime time schedule to Canadian content, having dropped U.S. network series in the mid-1990s. The French-language industry, centered in Quebec, similarly places a larger emphasis on original productions, due to viewer preferences over dubs of imported English-language programming, and to prioritize its insular "star system" of local talent. The English commercial networks (CTV, Global and Citytv), conversely, rely on news and information programs for the bulk of their Canadian content while running mostly American network series, but have still occasionally commissioned domestic productions for prime time broadcasts.

Some have suggested that Canadian content minimums be enacted for movie theatres, in order to improve the visibility and commercial viability of Canadian film, although none have ever been put in place. Most film festivals in Canada devote at least a portion of their schedules to Canadian films, although this is by choice rather than government regulation; a few film festivals are devoted exclusively to Canadian films, although most screen a mix of Canadian and international films. However, as movie-based premium television services such as Crave, Super Channel, Hollywood Suite and Super Écran operate on television and thus must follow Canadian content regulations, they do acquire and program Canadian films; this often still represents a Canadian film's best opportunity to attract an audience beyond the film festival circuit.

Criteria 
What is considered Canadian content is determined by either the CRTC, or the Canadian Audio-Visual Certification Office (CAVCO) for film and television productions that are seeking its tax credit. The CRTC's requirements for a television program to be certified as a Canadian content include that:

 The producer of the program must be a Canadian citizen or permanent resident, and hold "full responsibility" in overseeing development, creative and financial control, and financing. The producer must also receive a renumeration that exceeds the aggregated renumeration of all foreign producer-related positions.
 The production must employ a minimum number of Canadian citizens or permanent residents in key creative positions, as determined by a points system. 
 The director or screenwriter for live-action productions, or the scriptwriter or storyboard supervisor for animated productions, and at least one of the two highest-paid lead performers, must be Canadian.
 For animated works, the key animation must be performed in Canada.
 Non-Canadians may not be credited as a producer, co-producer, line producer, or production manager
 At least 75% of all costs incurred for production services, as well as 75% of all costs incurred in post-production, must be for services provided in Canada.
 The program must fall within a CRTC-defined program category.

Examples

Early Canadian programming was often produced merely to fill content requirements, and featured exceedingly low budgets, rushed production schedules, poor writing and little in the way of production values and as a result did not attract much of an audience. One Canadian series, The Trouble with Tracy, is sometimes claimed as one of the worst television shows ever produced. However, even given these limitations, some productions managed to rise above the mediocre – both SCTV (originally on Global) and Smith & Smith (CHCH) grew from local low-budget productions with a limited audience to large production companies with a North American audience. SCTV also lampooned the Cancon rules, as well a request by the CBC for a filler segment featuring distinctively Canadian content, by developing the characters of Bob and Doug McKenzie—a caricature of stereotypical Canadians played by cast members Rick Moranis and Dave Thomas. Bob and Doug became the program's most popular characters, and spawned spin-offs such as comedy albums, commercials, the feature film Strange Brew, and the animated series Bob & Doug.

In the 1980s and early 1990s, distinctly Canadian drama series such as CBC's Street Legal or CTV's E.N.G. consistently drew hundreds of thousands of viewers each week. In the latter part of the 1990s and the early 2000s, Global's Traders and the CBC dramas Da Vinci's Inquest and Republic of Doyle completed long runs, buoyed by critical approval if not overwhelming viewer success. As for CTV, after short-lived runs of planned "flagship" drama series such as The City, The Associates and The Eleventh Hour, the network later found ratings success with series such as Corner Gas (a sitcom set at an eponymous gas station in rural Saskatchewan, filmed in the town of Rouleau), Flashpoint, and Motive. The CBC dramedy This Is Wonderland was a moderate success with a loyal fan base, but was nonetheless cancelled in 2006 after three seasons. Specialty channels also naturally produce Canadian content, some of which, most notably Showcase's mockumentary series Trailer Park Boys,  have been able to generate a strong mass appeal.

To complement their airings of American or British versions, Canadian networks have also produced local versions of unscripted television formats, including reality television series such as The Amazing Race Canada, Canadian Idol, and MasterChef Canada (CTV), The Great Canadian Baking Show (CBC), Big Brother Canada (Global), The Bachelor Canada and Canada's Got Talent (Citytv), and Canada's Drag Race (Crave and OutTV).

Canadian networks have sometimes fulfilled Cancon requirements by commissioning series filmed in Canada, but intended to be sold to broadcasters in larger foreign markets such as the United States and United Kingdom, such as CTV's Saving Hope, Sue Thomas: F.B.Eye, Mysterious Ways and Twice in a Lifetime, and Global's Wild Card and Rookie Blue. International co-productions such as Orphan Black (Space and BBC America), Copper (Showcase and BBC America), Killjoys (Space and Syfy), The Tudors (CBC, Showtime, BBC and TV3), and the early seasons of the current incarnation of Doctor Who (partially funded by CBC) are also common.

A few Canadian drama series, including Due South, The Listener, Motive, Flashpoint, and Saving Hope, have also been picked up by American networks and aired in prime time, although the majority of Canadian TV series which have aired in the United States have done so either in syndication, on cable channels, or on minor networks such as The CW and Ion Television. SCTV aired in a late night slot on NBC in the early 1980s. CBS aired a late-night block of crime dramas in the late 1980s and early 1990s which included a number of Canadian series, including Night Heat, Hot Shots, Adderly, Forever Knight and Diamonds, and later aired The Kids in the Hall in a late-night slot as well. The Red Green Show was also a success, being imported into the United States via PBS member stations. That show's cast often did pledge drive specials and received strong viewer support on PBS stations in the northern part of the United States, such as Iowa, Minnesota, Wisconsin, Michigan, New Hampshire and New York.

The CBC sitcom Schitt's Creek was co-produced with U.S. cable network Pop as its first original scripted series, but its later addition to the streaming service Netflix helped to bolster wider public awareness and critical acclaim of the series in the United States and worldwide. This culminated at the 72nd Primetime Emmy Awards in 2020 following its final season, where Schitt's Creek became the first series to sweep all seven major awards in their respective genre in the same year, and Dan Levy became the first to win awards for acting, directing, producing, and writing in the same year.

Canadian commercial television networks schedule a large percentage of their Canadian productions to air in the summer season; although traditionally a season of low viewership, this practice has actually been beneficial for Canadian television productions, influenced by widespread viewer preference for new programming over off-season repeats, as well as an increased chance of gaining a lucrative sale to one of the big four American networks—a revenue stream which is generally unavailable during the fall and winter television seasons.

The impact of the COVID-19 pandemic on television in the United States provided a major exception, with NBC importing the CTV medical drama Transplant (which premiered at midseason in Canada) for its fall primetime lineup, filling the timeslot normally filled by its own medical drama New Amsterdam (whose premiere was deferred to 2021). NBC subsequently picked up another Canadian medical drama from Global, Nurses, and ordered the second season of Transplant for a mid-season premiere in 2022. The CW similarly imported two Canadian programs—Coroner and Fridge Wars—to pad out its summer schedule.

Children's programming 
Canadian studios have had a significant presence in the children's television market, the domestic studio Nelvana has had interests in both children's television and publishing, and was acquired by Canadian broadcaster Corus Entertainment in 2000. In the 1990s, Nelvana made several major deals for educational programming with U.S. broadcasters such as CBS and PBS Kids (taking advantage of new U.S. mandates for educational programming), with all of them being adaptations of children's books.

The Montreal-based studio CINAR was well known for producing and distributing animated series with tie-ins for the educational market, such as Arthur—which was distributed on U.S. public television by Boston's PBS station WGBH. The company collapsed in 2001 following an accounting scandal, and had also faced allegations that it paid American writers to write for its shows under the names of Canadian citizens, while continuing to accept Canadian federal tax credits. The company was later purchased in 2004 by former Nelvana executives, and renamed Cookie Jar Group. The company was in turn acquired by Halifax-based DHX Media (now WildBrain) in 2012, which made it the largest independent owner of children's television content in the world.

Regulations

The CRTC presently requires that at least 55% of all programming aired annually by broadcast television stations, and at least 50% of programming aired daily from 6:00 pm to midnight, must be Canadian content. In May 2011, the annual CanCon requirement for private television broadcasters was lowered from 60% to 55% yearly. The CBC remains subject to the 60% quota.

Historically, much of these requirements have been fulfilled by lower-cost non-scripted programming, including networked talk shows (including daytime lifestyle shows such as CityLine and The Marilyn Denis Show) and entertainment news programs (such as ET Canada and eTalk), local newscasts and public affairs programming, and reruns of Canadian-produced library programs. As described above, often the remaining domestic content are scripted co-productions produced in partnership with a foreign broadcaster, or more recently, streaming services.

Further complicating matters for Canadian content is the existence of simultaneous substitution, a regulation that allows over-the-air broadcasters to require the substitution of feeds from American broadcast channels on local multichannel television providers if they are airing the same programming in simulcast, thus protecting their exclusive rights to earn revenue off such programming whenever it is broadcast in Canada. Therefore, Canadian networks have made significant effort to import popular American series to take advantage of the rule, which in turn crowds out Canadian programming to less-desirable time slots.

Over the years the CRTC has tried a number of strategies intended to increase the success of Canadian programming, including expenditure requirements and time credits for productions with specific requirements. In 1999, the CRTC mandated that stations owned by the largest private groups air at least eight hours of Canadian "priority programming" per-week between the hours of 7 and 11  p.m.; priority programming included scripted programs, documentaries, entertainment news, and variety programs.

In 2011, as part of its new "group-based" approach to licensing of television services owned by the largest private broadcasters (such as Bell Media, Corus Entertainment, and Rogers Media), the CRTC instituted new policies with a stronger focus on expenditures made into high-quality Canadian content, as opposed to quantity and scheduling. At least 30% of a group's revenue (which is officially aggregated across all of a group's television services, based on their individual revenue and historical expenditure mandates) must be spent on Canadian programming expenditures (CPEs). CPEs can be reallocated between a group's individual discretionary services, and up to 25% of CPEs for local stations can be allocated from a discretionary service. 

All services must also invest 5% of their revenue towards the production of "programs of national interest" (PNI), which include comedy, drama, long-form documentaries, children's programming, and qualifying awards presentations honouring Canadian creative talent. In 2017, the CRTC instituted a further requirement that 75% of the PNI expenditure be used to fund productions by independent companies. The CRTC also added credits on CPE for the involvement of producers from Indigenous (50%) and official language minority communities (25%; French outside of Quebec, and English within Quebec).

Trans-Pacific Partnership
There is concern about the Trans-Pacific Partnership Intellectual Property Provisions of the TPP in terms of CanCon. In October 2012, Canada formally became a TPP negotiating participant. In order to enter into the TPP agreement, Canada had to accept the terms agreed upon by the nine original signatory countries: Brunei, Chile, New Zealand, Singapore, Australia, Malaysia, Peru, United States, and Vietnam. According to MP Don Davies, Canada had no veto power over these terms and accepted the "existing unbracketed text, sight unseen and without input."

In September 2012, the International Intellectual Property Alliance, a U.S. private sector coalition representing over 3,200 U.S. producers and distributors of copyright protected materials, sent a submission to the U.S. Trade Representative's office requesting that the Trans-Pacific Partnership (TPP) agreement "be comprehensive in scope, strictly avoiding any sectoral carveouts that preclude the application of free trade disciplines. We note that several market access barriers [in] Canada involve, for example, content quota requirements for television, radio, cable television, direct-to-home broadcast services, specialty television, and satellite radio services."

After the replacement of the TPP with the Comprehensive and Progressive Agreement for Trans-Pacific Partnership in 2018, it was reported that Canada had secured an exemption from a clause in the agreement that prohibits discriminatory rules on foreign audio-video services in order to ask services to financially support the creation of Canadian content.

Theatre
In 1971, a group of Canadian playwrights issued the Gaspé Manifesto as a call for at least one-half of the programming at publicly subsidized theatres to be Canadian content.  The numerical goal was not achieved, but the following years saw an increase in Canadian content stage productions.

Reception 
Michael Geist has criticized the current requirements for film and television production to qualify as Canadian content as being outdated, citing that its requirements being largely dependent on Canadian involvement in specific roles (such as the producer, lead actors, directors, screenwriters, and composers) has led to situations where productions filmed in Canada, using Canadian personnel and talent, or adapted from works by Canadians (such as The Handmaid's Tale) may not necessarily qualify as "Canadian content"—instead being a "foreign location and service production" (FLSP) that uses Canadian resources. Geist noted in some cases that these productions were "frequently indistinguishable" from certified Canadian content, such as All or Nothing: Toronto Maple Leafs (which was filmed by Canadian crews, narrated by Canadian actor Will Arnett, and followed a Canadian sports franchise), and films such as The Decline and Turning Red (which both include a number of Canadian actors, personnel in prominent roles, and are set in Canadian locations). He also pointed out that Gotta Love Trump—a Canadian-produced documentary on former U.S. president Donald Trump—was able to receive the CAVCO certification despite only featuring one Canadian citizen as an interview subject.

See also

Music of Canada
Canadian cultural protectionism

References

Further reading

External links
MAPL system (CRTC)
CBC Archives Sam Sniderman (Sam the record man) talks about his support for CANCON in 1971

1971 in Canada
Television in Canada
Radio in Canada
Canadian music
Canadian Radio-television and Telecommunications Commission
Canadian identity
Protectionism
Cultural policy